Keegan Phillip Allen (born July 22, 1989) is an American actor, photographer, author and musician known for his main role as Toby Cavanaugh on the Freeform series Pretty Little Liars.

Early life  
Allen was born and raised in California, the son of actor Phillip R. Allen and artist Joan Snyder Allen. In 2009, he graduated with a Bachelor of Fine Arts degree from American Musical and Dramatic Academy. Allen is Jewish, as is his mother.

Career 
Allen's passion in his younger years tended towards photography, cinematography and other roles behind the camera. However, at age 13, he landed his first paid job for a small, non-speaking role in a documentary for Animal Planet. In 2010, Allen appeared in an episode of Nickelodeon's TV show Big Time Rush. Shortly after, he began playing the recurring role of Toby Cavanaugh, the love interest of Spencer Hastings (Troian Bellisario), on the ABC Family (later Freeform) mystery series Pretty Little Liars.

In addition to acting, Allen is an accomplished photographer who has published two photography books. In 2015, "life.love.beauty" was released." The Ingram and Publishers Weekly bestselling book, in Allen's words, "Takes you on a photographic voyage through my life so far." In 2018, Allen published "HOLLYWOOD: Photos and Stories from Foreverland."  

In 2017, Allen released a digital-only music single, "Million Miles Away." Also in 2017, he started the podcast Foreverland, about his life, interests and experiences. In 2014, he appeared as a celebrity guest at the Super Smash Bros. Invitational 2014.

On February 19, 2020, it was announced that Allen was cast as Liam Walker the brother of Cordell Walker in The CW crime drama series Walker reboot.

Bibliography 
 Allen, Keegan (2015). life.love.beauty. Macmillan Publishing.  .
 Allen, Keegan (2018). HOLLYWOOD: Photos and Stories from Foreverland. Macmillan Publishing. .

Filmography

Film

Television

Theater

Web

Music videos

Awards and nominations

References

External links
 
 
 

1989 births
Living people
21st-century American male actors
American male television actors
Male actors from California
Musicians from California
American male film actors
Jewish American male actors
21st-century American Jews